Most seat belt laws in the United States are left to the states and territories. However, the first seat belt law was a federal law, Title 49 of the United States Code, Chapter 301, Motor  Safety Standard, which took effect on January 1, 1968, that required all vehicles (except buses) to be fitted with seat belts in all designated seating positions. This law has since been modified to require three-point seat belts in outboard-seating positions, and finally three-point seat belts in all seating positions. Seat belt use was voluntary until New York became the first state to require vehicle occupants to wear seat belts, . New Hampshire is the only state that has no enforceable laws requiring adults to wear seat belts in a vehicle.

Primary and secondary enforcement 

U.S. seat belt use laws may be subject to primary enforcement or secondary enforcement.  Primary enforcement allows a law enforcement officer to stop and ticket a driver if they observe a violation.  Secondary enforcement means that a peace officer may only stop or cite a driver for a seat belt violation if the driver committed another primary violation (such as speeding, running a stop sign, etc.) at the same time. New Hampshire is the only U.S. state that does not by law require adult drivers to wear safety belts while operating a motor vehicle.

In 15 of the 50 states, non-use of seat belts is considered a secondary offense, which means that a police officer cannot stop and ticket a driver for the sole offense of not wearing a seat belt. (One exception to this is Colorado, where children not properly restrained is a primary offense and brings a much larger fine.) If a driver commits a primary violation (e.g., for speeding) they may additionally be charged for not wearing a seat belt. In most states, seat belt non-use was originally a secondary offense. Many states later changed it to a primary offense, the first being California in 1993.  Of the 30 states with primary seat belt use laws, all but California, Connecticut, Hawaii, Iowa, New Mexico, New York, North Carolina, Oregon, and Washington originally had only secondary enforcement laws.

Thirty-four states, the District of Columbia, American Samoa, Guam, the Northern Mariana Islands, Puerto Rico and the U.S. Virgin Islands have primary enforcement laws for front seats.

Laws by state and territory
This table summarizes seat belt use laws in the United States.

Seat belt use laws often do not themselves apply to children. Even so, all 50 U.S. states, the District of Columbia, and all 5 inhabited U.S. territories have separate child restraint laws. The table shows only the base fine, but not applicable add-on fees in many areas, such as the head injury fund and court security fees, which can increase the total assessed fine by up to a factor of five. These are also "first offense" fines, and subsequent offenses may be much higher.

Twenty-three states, the District of Columbia, Guam, and the Northern Mariana Islands had seat belt usage of 90% or higher in 2017.

Note: As of 2017, aggregate seat belt usage in road vehicles in the entire United States is 89.7%.

1 Arizona's law is Primary for under the age of 5.

2 Colorado and Missouri's law is Secondary for adults but Primary for those under the age of 16.

3 Idaho, North Dakota, Pennsylvania, Vermont and Virginia's law is Secondary for adults but Primary for under 18.

4 Kansas, Maryland, and New Jersey, law is Secondary Enforcement for rear seat occupants (18+ in Kansas).5 These states assess points on one's driving record for the seat belt violation.6 In California, an additional penalty of $29 shall be levied upon every $10 or fraction thereof, of every fine, penalty, or forfeiture imposed by and collected by the court for criminal offenses, including all traffic offenses, except parking offenses as defined in subdivision (i) of Penal Code § 1463. The additional penalty is calculated as follows: $10 state penalty required by PC 1464, $7 county penalty required by GC 76000(e), $5 court facilities construction penalty required by GC 70372(a), $5 DNA Identification Fund penalty required by GC 76104.6 and 76104.7, $2 emergency medical services penalty required by GC 76000.5. Separately, Penal Code § 1465.8 requires an imposition of an additional fee of $40 for court security on every conviction for a criminal offense, including a traffic offense, except parking offenses as defined in Penal Code § 1463. Additionally, GC 70373 requires a $35 criminal facilities conviction assessment.

Damages reduction 

A person involved in a car accident who was not using a seat belt may be liable for damages far greater than if they had been using a seat belt.  However, when in court, most states protect motorists from having their damages reduced in a lawsuit due to the non-use of a seat belt, even if they were acting in violation of the law by not wearing the seat belt.  Currently, damages may be reduced for the non-use of a seat belt in 16 states: Alaska, Arizona, California, Colorado, Florida (See F.S.A. 316.614(10)), Iowa, Michigan, Missouri, Nebraska, New Jersey, New York, North Dakota, Ohio, Oregon, West Virginia, and Wisconsin.

Effectiveness 
Seat belt laws are effective in reducing car crash deaths. One study found that mandatory-seatbelt laws reduced traffic fatalities in youths by 8% and serious traffic-related injuries by 9%, respectively. Primary-seatbelt laws seem to be more effective at reducing crash deaths than secondary laws.

See also
Seat belt legislation
Seat belt use rates in the United States
 Transportation safety in the United States

Notes

References

Automotive safety
United States law-related lists
Vehicle law
Seat belts

External Links  
 Federal Regulations Regarding Use of Seat Belts in Commercial Vehicles